is a Japanese fencer. He competed in the individual and team foil events at the 1976 Summer Olympics.

References

External links
 

1953 births
Living people
Japanese male foil fencers
Olympic fencers of Japan
Fencers at the 1976 Summer Olympics